The American University in Bosnia and Herzegovina (abbr. AUBiH) was a private university located in Tuzla, Bosnia and Herzegovina.

Staff
The lecturing staff were mainly domestic teachers with many guest lecturers and American staff.

As part of the now-defunct partnership agreement with State University of New York at Canton (SUNY), some students from AUBIH received double diplomas (both from the US and Bosnia & Herzegovina) and attended one semester in USA. Through this partnership, some students had opportunities for work placement with leading US companies such as Xerox, Microsoft, Johnson & Johnson and Kodak.

The President and founder of American University in Bosnia and Herzegovina was Denis Prcić, an entrepreneur from Tuzla who lived in Rochester, New York in the 1990s.

Academics
In 2007, the university opened a postgraduate department in Sarajevo, offering a fast-track master's degree in business administration (MBA). 
In 2009, it opened an undergraduate department in Banja Luka. In 2011, the AUBIH opened an undergraduate department in Mostar. 

The University was organized around the following colleges:

Faculty of Economics
Faculty of Engineering Science and Technology
Faculty of Public Affairs
Academy of Modern Arts

The university offered degrees in law, economics, international relations, cyber security and engineering

Partnerships
West Virginia University Partnership

On 21 June 2012, West Virginia University made a partnership with American University in Bosnia and Herzegovina. It's one of over 100 universities with which WVU has a global partnership.

New International Partnerships

American University in Bosnia and Herzegovina in September 2015 expanded its international partnership with universities in Turkey, Canada and the United States of America. The international partnership list was amended with the following universities: Western Kentucky University, Saint Louis University, Fontbonne University; Saint Paul University from Canada; Northwest Normal University form China and Doğuş University from Turkey. The purpose of cooperation between AUBIH and mentioned universities are student and faculty exchange, research cooperation, joint academic publications, and cooperation on joint academic projects.

References

Education in Bosnia and Herzegovina
Universities in Bosnia and Herzegovina
Universities in Sarajevo
Banja Luka
Educational institutions established in 2005
2005 establishments in Bosnia and Herzegovina
Buildings and structures in Tuzla
Universities in Tuzla